Prayer for the Weekend was released on 11 April 2007 and is the fourth studio album from Swedish rock band the Ark. It is their first album with the sixth member, keyboard player Jens Andersson.

The album contains, along with the lead single "Absolutely No Decorum", the song "The Worrying Kind", with which the Ark participated in the Eurovision Song Contest 2007, where the song finished 18th.

The singles released from the album are; "Absolutely No Decorum", "The Worrying Kind", "Prayer for the Weekend" and "Little Dysfunk You".

Track listing
All songs written by Ola Salo.

"Prayer for the Weekend" – 4:24
"The Worrying Kind" – 2:56
"Absolutely No Decorum" – 3:47
"Little Dysfunk You" – 4:09
"New Pollution" – 4:31
"Thorazine Corazon" – 3:44
"I Pathologize" – 2:54
"Death to the Martyrs" – 3:54
"All I Want Is You" – 2:58
"Gimme Love to Give" – 3:59
"Uriel" – 5:42
"Any Operator Will Do" – 3:37 (Bonus Track, digital album only)

Personnel
The Ark are:
 Ola Salo – Lead vocals and songwriting
 Martin Axén – Guitar and backing vocals
 Jepson – Guitar and backing vocals
 Leari – Bass and backing vocals
 Sylvester Schlegel – drums, electronic drums and programming
 Jens Andersson – keyboards, additional percussion and sound engineering

Additional personnel
Jens Lindgård – Trombone
Petter Lindgård – Trumpet
Sven Andersson – Saxophone and clarinet
Filip Runesson – Strings
Måns Block – percussion
Mauricio Canivilo – percussion
Christopher Dominique – Piano
Elisabeth Fornander, Oskar Humlebo, Maria Lilja, Simon Koudriavstev and Kristian Pehrsson – Additional background vocals
Jonas Nydessjö & Ola Salo – String arrangements
Marco Manieri – Producer, engineering and mixing
Thomas Berger and Björn Lindgård – Mastering
Oskar Humlebo –  Additional production

2007 albums
The Ark (Swedish band) albums